The distance modulus is a way of expressing distances that is often used in astronomy. It describes distances on a logarithmic scale based on the astronomical magnitude system.

Definition

The distance modulus  is the difference between the apparent magnitude  (ideally, corrected from the effects of interstellar absorption) and the absolute magnitude  of an astronomical object. It is related to the distance  in parsecs by:

This definition is convenient because the observed brightness of a light source is related to its distance by the inverse square law (a source twice as far away appears one quarter as bright) and because brightnesses are usually expressed not directly, but in magnitudes.

Absolute magnitude  is defined as the apparent magnitude of an object when seen at a distance of 10 parsecs. Suppose a light source has luminosity L(d) when observed from a distance of  parsecs, and luminosity L(10) when observed from a distance of 10 parsecs. The inverse-square law is then written like:

The magnitudes and flux are related by:

Substituting and rearranging, we get:

which means that the apparent magnitude is the absolute magnitude plus the distance modulus.

Isolating  from the equation , we find that the distance (or, the luminosity distance) in parsecs is given by

The uncertainty in the distance in parsecs (δd) can be computed from the uncertainty in the distance modulus (δμ) using

which is derived using standard error analysis.

Different kinds of distance moduli 
Distance is not the only quantity relevant in determining the difference between absolute and apparent magnitude. Absorption is another important factor and it may even be a dominant one in particular cases (e. g. in the direction of the galactic center).

Thus a distinction is made between distance moduli uncorrected for interstellar absorption (whose values would overestimate the distance if used naively) and absorption-corrected moduli.

Visual distance moduli are computed by calculating the difference between the observed apparent magnitude and some theoretical estimate of the absolute magnitude. True distance moduli require a further theoretical step, that is the estimation of the interstellar absorption coefficient.

Usage

Distance moduli are most commonly used when expressing the distance to other galaxies in the relatively nearby universe.  For example, the Large Magellanic Cloud (LMC) is at a distance modulus of 18.5, the Andromeda Galaxy's distance modulus is 24.4, and the galaxy NGC 4548 in the Virgo Cluster has a DM of 31.0.  In the case of the LMC, this means that Supernova 1987A, with a peak apparent magnitude of 2.8, had an absolute magnitude of -15.7, which is low by supernova standards.

Using distance moduli makes computing magnitudes easy. As for instance, a solar type star (M= 5) in the Andromeda Galaxy (DM= 24.4) would have an apparent magnitude (m) of 5 + 24.4 = 29.4, so it would be barely visible for the HST, which has a limiting magnitude of about 30 . This calculation can be done quickly in one's head.  Since it is apparent magnitudes which are actually measured at a telescope, this way of looking at things serves to highlight the fact that many discussions about distances in astronomy are really discussions about the putative or derived absolute magnitudes of the distant objects being observed.

References

 Zeilik, Gregory and Smith, Introductory Astronomy and Astrophysics (1992, Thomson Learning)

Physical quantities

de:Absolute Helligkeit#Entfernungsmodul